The first season of arbitration-based reality court show Judge Judy aired from September 16, 1996, to September 5, 1997, and consisted of 220 episodes. The season is currently streamed on ViacomCBS's Pluto TV courtroom station.

Reception
Prior to the court show debuting, it had been promoted as "Hot Bench," then "Hot Bench with Judge Judy" before ultimately becoming Judge Judy. When the series launched in September 1996, it went on the air with little media attention and publicity. By the end of October 1996, the show was averaging only a 1.5 rating, putting it in the mid-rank of the 159 syndicated shows on the air. At that time, it was never expected that the show's ratings would ever compete with highly successful daytime TV shows of that era, such as The Oprah Winfrey Show, The Rosie O'Donnell Show and The Jerry Springer Show.

According to Biographys documentary film on Sheindlin, "Judge Judy: Sitting in Judgment" (aired February 21, 2000), producers of Judge Judy were disappointed that the show was barely making it on the radar. It did not take long, however, for the court show to pick up momentum as Judge Judy rose to a 2.1 rating by the end of this first season.

The series premiered as the 3rd arbitration-based reality style court show, preceded by The People's Court (at the time, in an extended hiatus from cancelation due to low ratings after 12 seasons) and Jones & Jury (lasting only the 1994–95 season, short-lived from low ratings).

Celebrity guests litigants and witnesses
In contrast to the vast majority of the show's run which did not consist of any celebrities, occasional celebrity guests litigants and witnesses were not uncommon in the court show's very early seasons. Bea Arthur, famed actress from television series Maude and The Golden Girls, appeared in season 1, episode 30 on October 25, 1996. In her appearance, Arthur served as a witness for a defendant associated with animal-rights organization PETA.

Unaired Hot Bench pilot before Judge Judy began
Not to be confused with the series premiere, the show's 1995 pilot episode used to sell the program to Big Ticket by a talent agency (later known as "Rebel Entertainment Partners") has never aired on television. 

At the time of 1995 pilot before the show's official 1996 premiere, the court show's title was "Hot Bench" before later transitioning to Judge Judy. The pilot consisted of a test actor playing the role of bailiff as opposed to Petri Hawkins-Byrd, who ended up with the court show as bailiff for its entire 25 season run. This resulted from Sheindlin feeling there was a lack of chemistry between her and the pilot episode bailiff, and subsequently refusing him and other proposed actors the opportunity in favor of Byrd. Her work relationship with Byrd predates the courtroom series as he was her bailiff on a rotating basis in the Manhattan family court system from 1986 to 1989. When Byrd later sent Sheindlin a congratulatory letter in 1995, she asked if he would be her bailiff and he accepted.  

On May 21, 2021, Sheindlin was asked by USA Today what she recalled of her Judge Judy pilot episode. Sheindlin responded by expressing great disfavor with the pilot, indicating that Judge Judy producers only set up fictionalized cases for that episode and steered her to dramatized reactions and behaviors. This ultimately ended up in Sheindlin's production team sending only bits and pieces of the pilot to CBS for approval of the show's broadcast. During the interview, Sheindlin recounted:

I remember that somebody then was trying to fit me into a sort of cookie cutter (mold). They had seen the 60 minutes [documentary], and they thought the approach that they saw in 60 minutes could be almost a caricature, and I'm not a caricature of that person, I am that person. So the cases that they brought to me to do the pilot were not genuine, and I couldn't react to things that weren't genuine. Because when I'm trying to figure out the truth of a case, and there really is no truth, I can't work. So they took little snippets of the pilot and created a sizzle reel, along with  60 Minutes tape and sold that."

Episodes

References

1996 American television seasons
1997 American television seasons